"Brimful of Asha" is a song by English alternative rock band Cornershop from their third album, When I Was Born for the 7th Time (1997). The recording originally reached number 60 on the UK Singles Chart in 1997. After a remixed version by Norman Cook became a radio and critical success, the song was re-released and reached number one on the UK chart and number 16 on the US Billboard Modern Rock Tracks chart. The lyric is a tribute to Asha Bhosle.

Background
This song is based on the history of film culture in India. Since their beginnings, Indian films have relied heavily on song-and-dance numbers. The singing is almost always performed by background singers while the actors and actresses lip sync. Asha Bhosle is a playback singer who has sung over 12,000 songs and is referred to as "Sadi rani" (Punjabi for "our queen") at one point in the lyrics. In the slower, original album recording, playback singers Lata Mangeshkar (her elder sister) and Mohammed Rafi (one of the top male playback singers of the mid-century) are mentioned. The lyrics in the bridge contain a number of references to non-Indian music, including Georges Brassens' song "Les Amoureux des bancs publics", Jacques Dutronc, Marc Bolan, Argo Records and Trojan Records.

Critical reception
British magazine Music Week rated the song five out of five, writing that "the Asian-rock outfit deliver their most compulsive slice of pop to date, mixing a Velvet Underground-style groove with a truly ticklesome lyric, strings and a top tune." A reviewer from NME commented, "... Sadly not a song about the joys of chain-smoking, but in fact a celebration of the Asian music and films of our Tjinder's youth. The cognoscenti of the youth revolution will no doubt have heard this already on either its previous release or the album, but this may be the record to take the 'Shop into the crazy Global Hypermarket of the Top Ten. Not because it's a marvellously infectious good-time dance pop number, but because it repeats the line, "Everybody needs a bosom for a pillow"." David Fricke from Rolling Stone said, "You can almost smell the weed that went into the rhythms and smiles of "Good Shit" and "Brimful of Asha"."

Music video
The accompanying music video for the song was directed by Phil Harder and produced by Harder/Fuller Films. It was filmed in a house in Lewisham, London.

Norman Cook remix

English DJ Norman Cook (also known as Fatboy Slim) was asked to remix "Brimful of Asha" by speeding it up and modulating the song to a higher key (halfway between B-flat and B, rather than in A). The remix was released as a standalone single became a number-one single on the UK Singles Chart in February 1998.

In 2003, Q Magazine ranked the Fatboy Slim remix at number 840 in their list of the "1001 Best Songs Ever". In October 2011, NME placed it at number 105 on its list "150 Best Tracks of the Past 15 Years". In August 2010, Pitchfork placed the remix at number 113 in their list of "The Top 200 Tracks of the 1990s". NME ranked the remix at number 2 in their list of "The 50 Best Remixes Ever", saying it "does what the truly great remixes do – render you unable to enjoy the original". The remix was included in Pitchforks 2010 list of "25 Great Remixes" of the 1990s. The remix is featured prominently on the French children's TV channel Gulli, playing before each episode.

Track listings

1997
UK and European CD1
 "Brimful of Asha" (short version/radio friendly edit) – 3:31
 "Easy Winners" (part 1) – 4:43
 "Rehoused" – 4:05
 "Brimful of Asha" (Sofa Surfers Solid State radio mix) – 5:17

UK and European CD2
 "Brimful of Asha" (album version) – 5:16
 "Easy Winners" (part 2) – 5:56
 "Counteraction" – 2:44
 "Brimful of Asha" (Mucho Macho Bolan Boogie mix) – 6:48

UK 7-inch single
A. "Brimful of Asha" (short version)
B. "Easy Winners" (part 1)

1998

UK and Australian CD single; UK 12-inch single
 "Brimful of Asha" (single version)
 "Brimful of Asha" (Norman Cook remix single version)
 "u47's"
 "Brimful of Asha" (Norman Cook remix extended version)

UK 7-inch and cassette single
 "Brimful of Asha" (single version)
 "Brimful of Asha" (Norman Cook remix single version)

European CD single
 "Brimful of Asha" (Norman Cook remix single version)
 "Brimful of Asha" (single version)

Japanese CD single
 "Brimful of Asha" (Norman Cook full length remix)
 "Brimful of Asha" (Mucho Macho Bolan Boogie mix)
 "Brimful of Asha" (Sofa Surfers Solid State radio mix)
 "Easy Winners" (part 1)
 "Easy Winners" (part 2)
 "u47's"

Charts

Weekly charts

Year-end charts

Certifications

|}

Release history

References

External links
 Brimful Of Asha Meaning Explained

1997 songs
1997 singles
1998 singles
Cornershop songs
Music videos directed by Phil Harder
Number-one singles in Scotland
UK Independent Singles Chart number-one singles
UK Singles Chart number-one singles
Big beat songs